Želimlje is a settlement in the Municipality of Škofljica in central Slovenia. The municipality is part of the traditional region of Lower Carniola and is now included in the Central Slovenia Statistical Region.

Geography
Želimlje includes the hamlets of Brezovica, Kopija, Kurja Vas, Namršelj, Pleše, Podreber, Poljane, Rogovila, Škopačnik, and Trnje, as well as various isolated farmsteads. The remnants of Namršelj Manor, with elements from the 16th, 17th, and 18th centuries, stand in  Namršelj. Želimeljščica Creek, a tributary of the Iščica River, flows north through the settlement.

Name
Želimlje was attested in written sources in 1300 as Schelein (and as Salein in 1318 and 1326, Zelein in 1321, and Seleym in 1436). The name is originally a possessive adjective, shortened from *Želimľe (selo) (literally, 'Želimъ's village'). Today the name is declined either as a neuter singular adjective (Želímlje -ega) or as a feminine plural noun (Želímlje -melj). The originally neuter singular adjective was reanalyzed as an accusative plural, and then as a feminine nominative plural. The personal name Želimъ is a hypocorism from a name such as *Želimirъ, preserved today in the Slovene name Željko.

Church

The local parish church is dedicated to Saint Vitus and belongs to the Roman Catholic Archdiocese of Ljubljana. It was built between 1882 and 1884.

Notable people
Notable people that were born or lived in Želimlje include:
Fran Saleški Finžgar (1871–1962), writer
Anton Lesjak (1857–1942), historian
Mihael Levstik (1861–1939), orchard expert
Lovro Mencinger (a.k.a. Golski, 1835–1903), orchardist
Josip Schaut (died 1922), forestry expert and Auersberg estate manager

References

External links

Želimlje on Geopedia

Populated places in the Municipality of Škofljica